Lekhureng is a large village in Ga-Matlala in the Mogalakwena Local Municipality of the Waterberg District Municipality of the Limpopo province of South Africa. It is located 79 km northwest of the city of Polokwane

References 

Populated places in the Mogalakwena Local Municipality